Schönhauser Straße is a station on the Cologne Stadtbahn line 16, located in the Cologne district of Bayenthal. The station lies on Gustav-Heinemann-Ufer, adjacent to Schönhauser Straße, after which it is named.

The station was opened by the Bonn–Cologne Railway Company in 1905 and consists of two side platforms with two rail tracks.

See also 
 List of Cologne KVB stations

External links 
 station info page 

Cologne KVB stations
Rodenkirchen
Railway stations in Germany opened in 1905